Waverly Central School District is a school district serving Waverly, New York and the surrounding area. Eric Knolles is Superintendent.

Board of education
The board is made up of nine members. Current members are:
Parvin Mensch, President
Colleen Talada, Vice President
Doug Killgore
Renee Kinsley
Donald Mattison
Cory Robinson
Matt Talada
Kasey Traub
Kristi Zimmer

List of schools
High School:
Waverly High School (Grades 9–12), Principal - Ashlee Hunt
Middle School:
Waverly Middle School (Grades 5–8), Intermediate Principal - Brian Miller, Middle Principal - Paul Vesci
Elementary Schools:
Elm Street Elementary School (Grades 2–4), Principal - John Cheresnowsky
Lincoln Street Elementary School (Grades Pre K-1), Principal - Colleen Hall
Former:
Chemung Elementary School (closed in June 2016)

See also
 List of school districts in New York

External links
 Waverly Central School District

School districts in New York (state)
Education in Tioga County, New York